South Korea 253 Parliamentary constituencies each electing a single assembly member to the National Assembly by first past the post every four years. In addition 30 members are elected by an additional member system and another 17 are elected by proportional representation

The boundaries are regularly changed by the National Election Commission most recently in 2020.

Seoul

Busan

Chungbuk Province

Chungnam Province

Daegu

Daejeon

Gangwon Province

Gyeonggi Province

Gyeongbuk Province

Gyeongnam Province

Gwangju

Jeju Island

Jeonbuk province

Jeonnam

Incheon

Sejong City

Ulsan

References

Legislative elections in South Korea